Last Look at Eden is the eighth studio album by the Swedish rock band Europe. It was released on September 9, 2009 in Sweden by Universal and was released on September 14, 2009 in the UK, by Edel Music's international rock music label earMUSIC.

Release history

Album information
The band has described it as a modern retro rock album. "This time, we're taking some new directions with our songs, and we're exploring different styles," they stated, "There is a definite classic rock vibe on some of the tracks... a tip of the hat to groovin', funkin' 70s rock songs - but ones we have brought into the here and now."

During an interview with the Chilean radio station Radio Universo, vocalist Joey Tempest said that "Last Look at Eden is more a Europe album than Secret Society and Start from the Dark. Last Look at Eden is a real Europe album." Drummer Ian Haugland said that Start from the Dark and Secret Society had led up to Last Look at Eden, and Tempest agreed, saying, "We had to make those two albums in order to do this."

"With the two first comeback albums [Start from the Dark and Secret Society], we were very focused on trying to modernise the sound," Tempest said in an interview with the British magazine Classic Rock, "This time we followed our hearts and soul. It's very classic-sounding and melodic. It's almost like we've gone full circle."

Europe premiered one of the album tracks, "Mojito Girl", on the Chilean tour in April 2009. Two other tracks, "Last Look at Eden" and "Gonna Get Ready", were premiered on a concert in Norway in May.

In May 2009 Europe went to Gothenburg to work with director Patric Ullaeus on the music video for the first single, "Last Look at Eden", which was released on June 8, 2009. The video was premiered on Europe's MySpace page on June 3. In August Europe went back to Gothenburg to work with Ullaeus on the video for the second single, "New Love in Town", which was released on September 3, 2009. The video was premiered on Europe's MySpace page on September 5.

The album debuted at number 1 on the Swedish album chart. The album was also certificated Gold in Sweden.

Tour
The Last Look at Eden Tour started on November 7, 2009. Prior to this the band played at the Bloodstock Open Air festival in August 2009.

Track listing

Critical reception

"You can always count on good ol' Europe to supply grandiose and bombastic rock of the highest order (did any song score higher on the "arena rock-o-meter" than "The Final Countdown" back in the '80s?)," argues Greg Prato of Allmusic. "Last Look at Eden sounds exactly as you would picture a Europe album to be in 2009 - for better of for worse," he concludes his 3/5 review.

"A band who divide opinion between those who understand and those who still associate them with one novelty hit, Europe are streets ahead of most melodic rock competition, their latest album simply offering more confirmation," argues Kerrang!s Steve Beebee (3 out of 5 Ks).

Personnel
Europe
Joey Tempest – lead and backing vocals
John Norum – guitars
John Levén – bass
Mic Michaeli – keyboards, backing vocals
Ian Haugland – drums

Additional personnel
Titiyo – backing vocals on tracks 4, 7, 12
Kleerup – backing vocals on tracks 4, 7, 8, 12 and backwards piano outro on track 4
Andreas Carlsson - backing vocals on tracks 2, 3, 5
Magnus Sjölander - percussion
Czech National Symphony Orchestra

Production
Produced by Tobias Lindell and Europe
Mixed and engineered by Tobias Lindell
Mastered by Vlado Meller at Universal Mastering Studios, New York
Recorded and mixed at Bohus Sound Studios, Gothenburg
Additional production by Joey Tempest and Mic Michaeli
Additional recordings at Playyard Studios, Stockholm by Per Stappe and Ronny Bernström; Studio 13, Stockholm by Marcus Englof

Cover art
Art direction and design by Dimitrios Dimitriadis at Nightshade Design Collective
Band photos by Fredrik Etoall at Etoall Production

Chart positions

References

Europe (band) albums
2009 albums
Albums produced by Tobias Lindell